Print or printing may also refer to:

Publishing
 Canvas print, the result of an image printed onto canvas which is often stretched, or gallery-wrapped, onto a frame and displayed
Offset printing, the inked image is transferred from a plate to a rubber blanket and then to the printing surface.
Old master print,  a work of art produced by a printing process in the Western tradition
 Photographic printing, the process of producing a final image on paper
 Print run, all of the copies produced by a single set-up of the production equipment
 Printing is the process for reproducing text and images using a master form or template
 Printing press, a device for applying pressure to an inked surface resting upon a print medium
 Printmaking, process of making artworks by printing, normally on paper
 Release print, a copy of a film that is provided to a movie theater
 Textile printing, the process of applying color to fabric in patterns or designs
 Waterless printing, an offset lithographic printing process

Arts, entertainment, and media
 Animal print, clothing and fashion style in which the garment is made to resemble the pattern of the skin and fur of an animal
Print (magazine), a bimonthly magazine about visual culture and design
 Prints (album), a 2002 album by Fred Frith
 ThePrint, an Indian online newspaper

Computing
 PRINT (command), introduced in MS-DOS/IBM PC DOS 2.0 to provide print spooling capability

Other uses
 Printing, when the shape or outline of a firearm is visible through a garment
 Print Matthews (1840–1883), American sheriff who was murdered

See also

Printer (computing), a peripheral device which impresses graphics or text on paper
Fingerprint (disambiguation)
Footprint (disambiguation)
Imprint (disambiguation)
Print shop (disambiguation)